Turó de la Dona Morta (Dead Woman's Hill) is a mountain in the Selva comarca, Catalonia, Spain.

Geography
It is located within the Maçanet de la Selva municipal limits, between the Autovia C-35 and Carretera Nacional N-II highways.

The Turó de la Dona Morta is a hill of the Catalan Coastal Depression. The hills looks like the silhouette of a dead woman seen roughly from the north or from the south, although there is also a legend saying that in ancient times a woman was murdered in the hill.

See also
Mountains of Catalonia

References

External links
24-11-12 Blanes, Turo de la dona morta, turo de Puig Mari, Blanes biking route

Mountains of Catalonia
Selva